Gereb May Zib’i is a reservoir located in the  Kilte Awula’ilo woreda of the Tigray Region in Ethiopia. The earthen dam that holds the reservoir was built by the Tigray Bureau of Agriculture and Natural Resources, for purpose of livestock watering and human water consumption.

Environment 
The catchment of the reservoir is 0.79 km² large, with a perimeter of 3.93 km. The lithology of the catchment is Agula Shale and Antalo Limestone. Part of the water is lost through seepage; the positive side-effect is that this contributes to groundwater recharge.

References 

Reservoirs in Ethiopia
Tigray Region
Agriculture in Ethiopia
Water in Ethiopia